Jacqueline King is a British stage and television actress known for her role in Alan Ayckbourn's theatre production of GamePlan and as recurring character Sylvia Noble in Doctor Who from 2006 to 2023.

Career
King trained at the Bristol Old Vic Theatre School. After training, she worked as an actor in Africa, Canada, America, Sri Lanka, and UAE.

On returning to the UK, she appeared in several Alan Ayckbourn productions, including the original runs of Comic Potential (1999) and the Damsels in Distress trilogy (2001–2002). King went on to appear at the Orange Tree Theatre in productions of The Madras House, Press Cuttings, Major Barbara and Larkin with Women.

King has made several television appearances, including roles in Hetty Wainthropp Investigates, Casualty,  Life Begins, Lawless and Doctors (as recurring character Wendy Sheffield).

From 2004 to 2005 King had a regular role in the BBC crime drama series 55 Degrees North, as Georgina Hodge, alongside Don Gilet and Dervla Kirwan. In 2006 she appeared in two episodes of The Bill, as Ella Whittaker; and was cast in Doctor Who as Sylvia Noble, the overbearing, widowed mother of Catherine Tate’s character Donna Noble. She has reprised the role twice in the 2008 series, in a two-part special broadcast over the 2009 Christmas period, and since 2018 in audio productions for Big Finish Productions. In 2007, she appeared in House of Saddam, playing real-life diplomat April Glaspie. 2009 also saw her appear in one episode of Missing, alongside Pauline Quirke.

Filmography

Film

Television

References

External links

Jacqueline King at Amanda Howard Associates

Living people
British actresses
Year of birth missing (living people)